Eriocrania carpinella is a moth of the family Eriocraniidae. It is found in Japan (Honshu).

The larvae feed on hornbeam's, including Carpinus laxiflora, Carpinus cordata and Carpinus tschonoskii.

References

carpinella
Endemic fauna of Japan
Leaf miners
Moths described in 2010
Moths of Japan